The 1987 Tour de France was the 74th edition of Tour de France, one of cycling's Grand Tours. The Tour began in West Berlin on 1 July and finished on the Champs-Élysées in Paris on 26 July.

23 teams started the Tour, with nine cyclists each.

Teams

Cyclists

By starting number

By team

By nationality

The 207 riders that competed in the 1987 Tour de France represented 21 different countries. Riders from nine countries won stages during the race; French riders won the largest number of stages.

Notes

References

1987 Tour de France
1987